Roger Dodger could refer to:

 Roger the Dodger, a Comic Strip featured frequently in the British comic The Beano
 Roger Dodger (phrase)
 Roger the Dodger, a nickname for former Dallas Cowboys quarterback Roger Staubach
 Roger Dodger (film), a 2002 comedy film starring Campbell Scott
 Rodger Dodger (The Penguins of Madagascar episode), an episode of The Penguins of Madagascar